Maniac Meat is the second studio album by Tobacco. It was released through Anticon on May 25, 2010. Beck provided vocals on "Fresh Hex" and "Grape Aerosmith". The album peaked at number 16 on the Billboard Top Dance/Electronic Albums chart, as well as number 44 on the Heatseekers Albums chart.

Critical reception
At Metacritic, which assigns a weighted average score out of 100 to reviews from mainstream critics, the album received an average score of 69% based on 11 reviews, indicating "generally favorable reviews".

Track listing

Charts

References

External links
 

2010 albums
Anticon albums
Tobacco (musician) albums